Long Creek Falls is a waterfall located in Fannin County, Georgia. The falls are located in Chattahoochee National Forest near Three Forks, and are accessible from the Appalachian Trail, the Benton MacKaye Trail, and the Duncan Ridge Trail. It is considered a serene destination for Atlanta city goers to seek out during the weekends, especially in October.

External links
Long Creek Falls on atlantatrails.com
Long Creek Falls profile on GeorgiaTrails.com

Protected areas of Fannin County, Georgia
Waterfalls of Georgia (U.S. state)
Chattahoochee-Oconee National Forest
Landforms of Fannin County, Georgia